Ses Bardetes is a village in Formentera, Balearic Islands, Spain. It is located directly south of the capital of Sant Francesc Xavier.

Populated places in Formentera